The 2019 Magnolia Hotshots season was the 31st season of the franchise in the Philippine Basketball Association (PBA).

Key dates

2018
December 16: The 2018 PBA draft took place in Midtown Atrium, Robinson Place Manila.

Roster

Philippine Cup

Eliminations

Standings

Game log

|-bgcolor=ffcccc
| 1
| February 3
| TNT
| L 75–80 (OT)
| Robbie Herndon (16)
| Barroca, Sangalang (9)
| Jio Jalalon (8)
| Mall of Asia Arena
| 0–1
|-bgcolor=ffcccc
| 2
| February 10
| San Miguel
| L 92–113
| Ian Sangalang (19)
| Rafi Reavis (6)
| Mark Barroca (4)
| Smart Araneta Coliseum
| 0–2
|-bgcolor=ffcccc
| 3
| February 13
| Rain or Shine
| L 74–75
| Barroca, Sangalang (16)
| Ian Sangalang (18)
| Jio Jalalon (5)
| Mall of Asia Arena
| 0–3

|-bgcolor=ccffcc
| 4
| March 2
| Meralco
| W 92–86
| Jio Jalalon (19)
| Ian Sangalang (16)
| Barroca, Jalalon (4)
| Xavier University Gym
| 1–3
|-bgcolor=ffcccc
| 5
| March 6
| Phoenix
| L 87–89
| Barroca, Lee (16)
| Rafi Reavis (8)
| Jio Jalalon (9)
| Smart Araneta Coliseum
| 1–4
|-bgcolor=ccffcc
| 6
| March 9
| Alaska
| W 103–86
| Ian Sangalang (24)
| Ian Sangalang (14)
| Ian Sangalang (6)
| Ynares Center
| 2–4
|-bgcolor=ccffcc
| 7
| March 13
| Columbian
| W 109–83
| Ian Sangalang (16)
| dela Rosa, Jalalon, Lee (7)
| Barroca, Lee (6)
| Smart Araneta Coliseum
| 3–4
|-bgcolor=ffcccc
| 8
| March 17
| Barangay Ginebra
| L 93–97 (OT)
| Mark Barroca (23)
| Ian Sangalang (13)
| Barroca, Sangalang (7)
| Smart Araneta Coliseum
| 3–5
|-bgcolor=ccffcc
| 9
| March 20
| NorthPort
| W 103–90
| Paul Lee (24)
| Rafi Reavis (10)
| Barroca, Melton (5)
| Smart Araneta Coliseum
| 4–5
|-bgcolor=ccffcc
| 10
| March 22
| Blackwater
| W 97–87
| Rome dela Rosa (17)
| Brondial, Sangalang (10)
| Barroca, Sangalang (5)
| Ynares Center
| 5–5

|-bgcolor=ccffcc
| 11
| April 3
| NLEX
| W 102–74
| Paul Lee (26)
| Rodney Brondial (9)
| Jio Jalalon (5)
| Smart Araneta Coliseum
| 6–5

Playoffs

Bracket

Game log

|-bgcolor=ffcccc
| 1
| April 6
| Barangay Ginebra
| L 75–86
| Paul Lee (15)
| Rodney Brondial (9)
| Barroca, Lee, Sangalang (3)
| Mall of Asia Arena
| 0–1
|-bgcolor=ccffcc
| 2
| April 8
| Barangay Ginebra
| W 106–77
| Ian Sangalang (21)
| Ian Sangalang (9)
| Jio Jalalon (6)
| Smart Araneta Coliseum
| 1–1
|-bgcolor=ccffcc
| 3
| April 10
| Barangay Ginebra
| W 85–72
| Paul Lee (25)
| Ian Sangalang (10)
| Jio Jalalon (6)
| Smart Araneta Coliseum11,147
| 2–1

|-bgcolor=ffcccc
| 1
| April 12
| Rain or Shine
| L 77–84
| Paul Lee (15)
| Rafi Reavis (10)
| Paul Lee (6)
| Smart Araneta Coliseum
| 0–1
|-bgcolor=ffcccc
| 2
| April 14
| Rain or Shine
| L 80–93
| Herndon, Sangalang (13)
| Jio Jalalon (8)
| Jio Jalalon (5)
| Smart Araneta Coliseum
| 0–2
|-bgcolor=ccffcc
| 3
| April 16
| Rain or Shine
| W 85–74
| Lee, Sangalang (16)
| Reavis, Sangalang (11)
| Mark Barroca (6)
| Smart Araneta Coliseum
| 1–2
|-bgcolor=ccffcc
| 4
| April 22
| Rain or Shine
| W 94–91
| Ian Sangalang (19)
| Rafi Reavis (11)
| Jio Jalalon (4)
| Smart Araneta Coliseum
| 2–2
|-bgcolor=ccffcc
| 5
| April 24
| Rain or Shine
| W 82–74
| Barroca, Jalalon (14)
| Rafi Reavis (12)
| Barroca, Jalalon (3)
| Cuneta Astrodome
| 3–2
|-bgcolor=ffcccc
| 6
| April 26
| Rain or Shine
| L 81–91
| Ian Sangalang (19)
| Reavis, Sangalang (8)
| Jio Jalalon (8)
| Ynares Center
| 3–3
|-bgcolor=ccffcc
| 7
| April 28
| Rain or Shine
| W 63–60 (OT)
| Lee, Sangalang (11)
| Rafi Reavis (20)
| Jio Jalalon (4)
| Mall of Asia Arena
| 4–3

|-bgcolor=ccffcc
| 1
| May 1
| San Miguel
| W 99–94
| Paul Lee (18)
| Ian Sangalang (12)
| Paul Lee (5)
| Smart Araneta Coliseum
| 1–0
|-bgcolor=ffcccc
| 2
| May 3
| San Miguel
| L 101–108
| Ian Sangalang (18)
| Paul Lee (10)
| Jio Jalalon (8)
| Smart Araneta Coliseum
| 1–1
|-bgcolor=ccffcc
| 3
| May 5
| San Miguel
| W 86–82
| Mark Barroca (22)
| Reavis, Sangalang (15)
| Jio Jalalon (5)
| Smart Araneta Coliseum
| 2–1
|-bgcolor=ffcccc
| 4
| May 8
| San Miguel
| L 98–114
| Barroca, Jalalon (22)
| Ian Sangalang (11)
| Jio Jalalon (5)
| Smart Araneta Coliseum
| 2–2
|-bgcolor=ccffcc
| 5
| May 10
| San Miguel
| W 88–86
| Mark Barroca (22)
| Ian Sangalang (14)
| Jio Jalalon (9)
| Smart Araneta Coliseum
| 3–2
|-bgcolor=ffcccc
| 6
| May 12
| San Miguel
| L 86–98
| Jio Jalalon (17)
| Paul Lee (7)
| Jio Jalalon (8)
| Smart Araneta Coliseum
| 3–3
|-bgcolor=ffcccc
| 7
| May 15
| San Miguel
| L 71–72
| Ian Sangalang (18)
| Rafi Reavis (8)
| Jalalon, Lee (6)
| Smart Araneta Coliseum
| 3–4

Commissioner's Cup

Eliminations

Standings

Game log

|-bgcolor=ffcccc
| 1
| June 5
| Alaska
| L 80–103
| Ian Sangalang (17)
| Ian Sangalang (9)
| Rome dela Rosa (3)
| Smart Araneta Coliseum
| 0–1
|-bgcolor=ffcccc
| 2
| June 12
| NorthPort
| L 99–102
| Ian Sangalang (21)
| James Farr (14)
| Paul Lee (8)
| Smart Araneta Coliseum
| 0–2
|-bgcolor=ccffcc
| 3
| June 14
| NLEX
| W 98–88
| James Farr (24)
| James Farr (21)
| Paul Lee (6)
| Mall of Asia Arena
| 1–2
|-bgcolor=ccffcc
| 4
| June 16
| Columbian
| W 110–103
| Farr, Sangalang (22)
| Jio Jalalon (12)
| Jio Jalalon (7)
| Smart Araneta Coliseum
| 2–2
|-bgcolor=ccffcc
| 5
| June 22
| Phoenix
| W 99–96
| Paul Lee (27)
| James Farr (18)
| Paul Lee (7)
| Cuneta Astrodome
| 3–2
|-bgcolor=ccffcc
| 6
| June 26
| San Miguel
| W 118–82
| James Farr (19)
| James Farr (18)
| Jio Jalalon (10)
| Smart Araneta Coliseum
| 4–2
|-bgcolor=ccffcc
| 7
| June 29
| Meralco
| W 99–88
| Mark Barroca (21)
| James Farr (17)
| Mark Barroca (7)
| Mayor Vitaliano D. Agan Coliseum
| 5–2

|-bgcolor=ffcccc
| 8
| July 5
| Blackwater
| L 99–104 (OT)
| Paul Lee (25)
| James Farr (20)
| Paul Lee (8)
| Mall of Asia Arena
| 5–3
|-bgcolor=ffcccc
| 9
| July 7
| Barangay Ginebra
| L 81–102
| James Farr (34)
| James Farr (21)
| Paul Lee (6)
| Smart Araneta Coliseum
| 5–4
|-bgcolor=ffcccc
| 10
| July 10
| Rain or Shine
| L 82–86
| Ian Sangalang (24)
| James Farr (23)
| Mark Barroca (9)
| Smart Araneta Coliseum
| 5–5
|-bgcolor=ffcccc
| 11
| July 17
| TNT
| L 83–98
| Paul Lee (23)
| James Farr (14)
| Christmas, Jalalon, Melton (3)
| Smart Araneta Coliseum
| 5–6

Playoffs

Bracket

Game log

|-bgcolor=ffcccc
| 1
| July 20
| Barangay Ginebra
| L 79–85
| Paul Lee (24)
| Rakeem Christmas (14)
| Jio Jalalon (4)
| Mall of Asia Arena
| 0–1
|-bgcolor=ffcccc
| 2
| July 23
| Barangay Ginebra
| L 80–106
| Mark Barroca (17)
| Jio Jalalon (10)
| Jio Jalalon (6)
| Smart Araneta Coliseum
| 0–2

Governors' Cup

Eliminations

Standings

Bracket

Awards

References

Magnolia Hotshots seasons
Magnolia Hotshots